The Government Polytechnic, Nagpur is an autonomous educational institution of the government of Maharashtra, a state in Western India.

History
It was founded on 14 July 1914 as the Government Engineering School. At its commencement the school had 16 students on roll and was located in the Victoria Science College (now the Institute of Science) in Nagpur. During its first year the school provided courses in Civil Engineering & Mechanical Engineering up to diploma standard. Later in 1915 Automobile Engineering Course was also established which vias subsequently converted into Post Diploma in Automobile Engineering. The institution has given birth to Engineering College presently known as Visvesvaraya National Institute of Technology, Nagpur(VNIT). The school was expanding rapidly & from 16 students enrolled in 1914 increased to nearly 2000 in current year and Govt. Engineering School converted to Government Polytechnic, Nagpur.

Campus

The total intake capacity of all these programmes is 890 students. The premises of this institute is spread over 22 acres of land. Accommodation for 180 boys, 54 girls & 20 trainees is also available in the campus.

Academics

Government Polytechnic Nagpur has various academic departments, with specialized laboratories and research centers.

Departments
Applied Chemistry
Applied Mathematics
Applied Physics
Applied Mechanics
Humanities & Social Science
Civil Engineering
Mechanical Engineering
Mechatronics Engineering
Electrical Engineering
Electronics and Telecommunication Engineering
Computer Technology
Information Technology
Packaging Technology
Metallurgical Engineering
Textile Manufacturer
Mine & Mine Surveying
Automobile Engineering
Travel & Tourism

Courses
The institute is selected by Govt. of Maharashtra as a training provider in Information Technology to various institutions. Presently the institute is providing training to staff & students of Institute of Science, Nagpur & I.T.I in the region, Govt. Hotel Management & Catering Technology, Nagpur in addition to the institute.
Government of Maharashtra awarded academic autonomy to this institute in the year 1995.
The institute is conducting certificate courses of 3 months, 6 months, one-year duration in Information Technology & other advanced technology areas for 10th, 12th, graduate students.
The World Bank Assisted Project was implemented at this institute from 1992 to 1995 for improvement of quality of technician education. Canada-India Institute Industry Linkage Project was implemented in the institute from 2000-2004.

Awards
The institute was awarded World Bank assisted Technical Education Quality Improvement Program (TEQIP) through competitive bidding and received ₨2.55 crores. This fund was utilised for academic excellence, Networking of institutes and services to community and economic development.
This institute received ISTE Narsee Monjee award for overall Best Performance in the year 1996 and Best Polytechnic award of Government of Maharashtra in the year 1997.

Courses Offered 

All the above courses are of 3 years duration.

References

External links 
 Official Website

Engineering colleges in Nagpur
Educational institutions established in 1914
1914 establishments in India